Giby , is a village in Sejny County, Podlaskie Voivodeship, in north-eastern Poland, close to the borders with Belarus and Lithuania. It is the seat of the gmina (administrative district) called Gmina Giby.

The village has an approximate population of 1,000. It was established in 1594.

Today's Catholic church of St. Anne (1912) originally served Old Believers in Pogorzelec village, from where it was moved to Giby in 1982.

See also
 Augustów chase 1945

References

Villages in Sejny County